Chamber Made, formerly known as Chamber Made Opera, is an Australian arts organisation based in Melbourne, creating work operating at the intersections of music, sound and contemporary performance.

Formed in 1988 by theatre director and librettist Douglas Horton, it was Australia's only full-time company exclusively devoted to the commissioning and presentation of contemporary chamber opera by living artists. After taking up the artistic directorship in 2010, David Young commissioned and presented twelve new Australian operas, many of which were created as part of the company's "Living Room Opera" series. In 2013, Tim Stitz was appointed as Creative Director, leading a new company model consisting of four Artistic Associates. Since 2014 an overt focus on chamber opera has evolved into a broader remit of creating works that re-imagine how music and performance can converge. In 2017, the company restructured again and Tamara Saulwick was appointed Artistic Director.

Chamber Made works with established artists and emerging professionals. The company also engages performers from different disciplines and non-traditional music and performance backgrounds. Their productions are highly interdisciplinary, incorporating sophisticated composition and experimental performance practice.

The company has forged partnerships with Punctum, Limerick City of Culture, In Between Time Festival, Arts Centre Melbourne, RMIT University, La Mama Theatre, Aphids, Speak Percussion, Melbourne Recital Centre, the Victorian Opera, the Victorian Writers' Centre, The Wheeler Centre, Fed Square, Bell Shakespeare, Rawcus, Malthouse Theatre, New Music Network, and the Australian Music Centre.

The company has multi-year, re-current funding from Creative Victoria and has an enduring support base from philanthropic and earned income. Chamber Made is based in a studio managed by the City of Melbourne's Meat Market tenancy program.

Company history
Chamber Made Opera was founded in 1988 by Artistic Director Douglas Horton and General Manager Stephen Armstrong. The company quickly established itself as a force in the Australian arts industry, presenting many acclaimed works (see below for list of productions), winning awards, and touring nationally and internationally. Horton was the librettist for many of the company’s works; he stepped down as Artistic Director in March 2009, after 21 years.

In 2010 composer David Young was appointed the role of Artistic Director, a position he held until December 2013. Young lead the company through a period of rejuvenation and transformation, pioneering the innovative Living Room Opera series (see below).

In early 2013 CMO announced a new company structure would be installed following the departure of David Young, headed by new Creative Director Tim Stitz, who appointed a team of four Artistic Associates to join him in the next phase of the company's life. In 2017, Tamara Saulwick moved from the role of Artistic Associate to Artistic Director.

Past staff include Artistic Director David Young, Creative Director / CEO Tim Stitz, Artistic Associate Sarah Kriegler, Artistic Associate Christie Stott, Artistic Associate Erkki Veltheim, General Managers Robina Burton and Geoffrey Williams, Resident Director Margaret Cameron, Resident Conductor Brett Kelly, Caroline Lee, and the late Jacqueline (Jacqui) Everitt, designer.

Productions
Only first productions are listed

1988 The Heiress, music: Donald Hollier, text after Henry James' novel Washington Square
1989 Recital, music: David Chesworth, Puccini, Mozart et al., text: Douglas Horton and Helen Noonan
1990 The Fall of the House of Usher, music: Philip Glass, text: Arthur Yorinks after Edgar Allan Poe
1991 Greek, music: Mark-Anthony Turnage, text: Steven Berkoff
1991 Sweet Death, music: Andree Greenwell, text: Abe Pogos after Claude Tardat
1992 The Cars That Ate Paris, musical improvisation, text by Douglas Horton after Peter Weir
1992 Lacuna, music: David Chesworth, text: Douglas Horton
1993 Improvement: Don Leaves Linda, music & text: Robert Ashley
1993 Medea, music: Gordon Kerry, text: Justin Macdonnell after Seneca
1994 The Two Executioners, music: David Chesworth, text: Douglas Horton after Fernando Arrabal's Les Deux Bourreaux
1995 Tresno, music & text: Jacqui Rutten
1995 The Burrow, music: Michael Smetanin, text: Alison Croggon
1997 Wide Sargasso Sea, music: Brian Howard, text Brian Howard after Jean Rhys
1997 Fresh Ghosts, music: Julian Yu, text: Glenn Perry after Lu Xun
1998 Dr Forbes Will See You Now, music: Stephen Ingham, text: Douglas Horton
1998 Matricide – The Musical, music: Elena Kats-Chernin, text: Kathleen Mary Fallon
1999 Eight Songs For A Mad King, music: Peter Maxwell Davies, text: Randolph Stow
2000 Gauguin (a synthetic life), music: Michael Smetanin, text: Alison Croggon
2000 Teorema, music: Giorgio Battistelli, scenario after Pier Paolo Pasolini
2002 Slow Love, music: Stevie Wishart, text: Richard Murphett
2002 Motherland, music: Dominique Probst, text: Le Quy Duong
2003 The Possessed, music: Julian Yu, text: Glenn Perry
2003 Phobia, music: Gerard Brophy, text: Douglas Horton, in homage to Alfred Hitchcock
2003 Walkabout, music & text: Richard Frankland after Nicolas Roeg
2004 The Charcoal Club (aka Burning Embers), music & text: Richard Frankland
2006 Corruption, music: Sasha Stella, text: Ania Walwicz after Elisa Evers
2006 The Hive, music: Nicholas Vines, text: Sam Sejavka
2007 Crossing Live, music: Bryony Marks, text: Matthew Saville
2008 The Children's Bach, music: Andrew Schultz, text: Glenn Perry based on Helen Garner's novella
2010 Another Lament, music: Ida Duelund Hansen
2010 The Itch, music: Alex Garsden
2010 Exile, the world's first iPad opera, music: Helen Gifford
2011 Minotaur: The Island, music: David Young, text: Margaret Cameron
2011 Dwelling Structure, by Madeleine Flynn and Tim Humphrey, libretto Cynthia Troup
2011 Ophelia Doesn't Live Here , music: Darrin Verhagen, director: Daniel Schlusser
2012 The Box, by Fritz Hauser with Boa Baumann, libretto Willoh S. Weiland
2012 PM – An incidental video opera, by Peter Lambropoulos
2012 The Minotaur Trilogy, music: David Young, text: Margaret Cameron
2013 Turbulence, music: Juliana Hodkinson, libretto: Cynthia Troup
2013 Opera – therapea, by David Young, Margaret Cameron, Hellen Sky, Deborah Kayser, Jane Refshuage
2013 Between Lands and Longings, by Zierle & Carter
2013 Opera for a small mammal, written and performed by Margaret Cameron
2014 Wake, conceived by Maeve Stone and John Rodgers, composed by Tom Lane
2014 Another Other, created and performed by Erkki Veltheim, Sabina Maselli, Natasha Anderson, and Anthony Pateras
2015 Captives of the City, co-created by Chamber Made and Lemony S Puppet Theatre
2016 Permission to Speak, created by Tamara Saulwick and Kate Neal, performed by Gian Slater, Georgie Darvidis, Josh Kyle and Edward Fairlie
2017 Between 8&9, created by Australian and Chinese artists in a collaborative process led by Madeleine Flynn and Tim Humphrey
2018 Dybbuks, conceived and directed by Samara Hersch
2019 Diaspora, created by Robin Fox and collaborators
2020 Dragon Ladies Don't Weep, created by Tamara Saulwick, Nick Roux and Kok Heng Leun, performed by Margaret Leng Tan
2021 SYSTEM_ERROR, co-created and performed by Tamara Saulwick and Alisdair Macindoe, directed by Lucy Guerin, with Melanie Huang as data visualisation artist
2022 My Self in That Moment, led by Tamara Saulwick, composed by Peter Knight, performed by Jessica Aszodi, Alice Hui-Sheng Chang, and Tina Stefanou

Awards
1992 Myer Group Arts Award – Chamber Made Opera
1994 The Age Performing Arts Awards – Most Outstanding Fringe Performance: The Two Executioners
1995 A Creative Artist Fellowship [aka a 'Keating', after the then Prime Minister, Mr Paul Keating] - AD/CEO Douglas Horton, for services to contemporary Australian opera
2002 Green Room Awards – Best New Score: Slow Love
2002 Green Room Awards – Best Lighting Design: Motherland
2006 Green Room Awards – Best Opera Production: The Hive
2007 Helpmann Awards – Best Opera Direction: Douglas Horton for The Hive
2007 Green Room Awards – Best New Australian Work: Crossing Live,
2007 Green Room Awards - Best Performance, New Form: Luke Elliott in Crossing Live
2013 Art Music Awards – Victorian Performance of the Year, Excellence by an Organisation: The Minotaur Trilogy
2016 Green Room Awards - Puppetry Performance: Captives of the City
2016 Green Room Awards - Design & Realisation in Contemporary Performance: Captives of the City
2017 Art Music Awards - Victorian Performance of the Year: Permission to Speak
2018 Green Room Awards - Sound Performance: Between 8&9
2018 Art Music Awards - Excellence in Experimental: Between 8&9
2020 Green Room Awards - Visual Design: Diaspora
2020 Green Room Awards - Best Production: Diaspora
2021 Music Theatre NOW: Dybbuks
2021 Art Music Awards - Work of the Year Dramatic: Dragon Ladies Don't Weep

Discography
2001 Wicked Voice includes excerpts from Lacuna and The Two Executioners (Chesworth/Horton), ABC Classics
2007 Medea (Kerry/Macdonnell), ABC Classics
2012 Another Lament (Ida Duelund), Chamber Made Opera Records
2013 Winterreise (Ida Duelund), Chamber Made Opera Records
2013 The Minotaur Trilogy box set, Chamber Made Opera Records

Living Room Operas
From 2010 to 2014, a series of domestic-scale chamber operas were commissioned and developed for presentation in living rooms of residential houses.

The Living Room Opera Series involved artists and musicians from a range of styles and backgrounds. This series aimed to give the audience new, chamber operas in close proximity.

In 2010 new works by composer Alex Garsden, Rawcus Theatre Company, and the Quiver Ensemble were commissioned and presented in a range of domestic settings with investment by individual donors. The Series represents a mobile and scalable model with support from private philanthropy.

Productions that featured in the series were The Itch (2010), Another Lament (2010), Dwelling Structure (2011), Ophelia Doesn't Live Here Anymore (2011), Minotaur The Island (2011), The Box (2012), PM An incidental Video Opera (2012), Between Lands and Longings (2013), Turbulence (2013), and Wake (2014).

The Venny
From 2012-2018, CMO partnered with the Kensington Adventure Playground (The Venny), to deliver a community outreach program for young people. Each year the company enabled professional artists to work with the children and staff of The Venny to develop and present a creative project exploring the children's interests and teaching them creative skills whilst building a sense of fortitude and community.

References

External links
Chamber Made Opera official site

Theatre companies in Australia
Australian opera companies
Musical groups established in 1988
1988 establishments in Australia
Performing arts in Melbourne